Carlos Sebastián Sosa Silva (born 19 August 1986) is a Uruguayan professional footballer who plays as a goalkeeper for Liga MX club UNAM and the Uruguay national team.

Club career
Sosa made his debut for Peñarol in 2007. In 2008, he was loaned to Central Español, where he played 28 games in two years, before returning to Peñarol.

Upon his return, Sosa was the second choice goalkeeper behind former Argentine international Pablo Cavallero, until coach Julio Ribas chose him for the starting eleven of Peñarol for the 2009–10 Uruguayan Primera División season. During that season, Sosa helped Peñarol to win the league title. Afterwards, Sosa was a regular in the Peñarol team that also reached the final of the 2011 Copa Libertadores (where his team was defeated by Santos.

In July 2011, the Uruguayan goalkeeper signed for Argentine giants Boca Juniors. During his one-year stay at Boca, Sosa was mostly a substitute for Agustín Orión, but won with the team the 2011 Apertura and the 2011–12 Copa Argentina.

Subsequently, Sosa joined Vélez Sársfield also of Argentina. There he again the second choice goalkeeper (behind Germán Montoya) at first, but then became a regular starter and played 9 games in his team's 2012 Inicial winning campaign. Sosa was also a starter in Vélez victories in the 2012–13 Superfinal and the 2013.

In June 2015, after his contract with Vélez ended, he joined Pachuca.

In January 2017, Sosa joined Monarcas Morelia on loan from Pachuca. He was the second choice goalkeeper behind Carlos Felipe Rodriguez, for the majority of the season as Morelia battled relegation. After making a great impression that culminated with a Copa MX runner up finish, Sosa was promoted to first choice goalkeeper for the last 2 games of the season as Morelia inched away from relegation.

International career
Sosa has played for Uruguay's under-17 and under-20 teams at youth level. At the age of 35, he made his senior team debut on 11 June 2022 in a 5–0 friendly win against Panama.

Career statistics

International

Honours
Peñarol
Uruguayan Primera División (1): 2009–10
Boca Juniors
Argentine Primera División (1): 2011 Apertura
Copa Argentina (1): 2011–12
Vélez Sársfield
Argentine Primera División (2): 2012 Inicial, 2012–13 Superfinal
Supercopa Argentina (1): 2013

Individual
Liga MX Player of the Month: September 2019

References

External links
 
 

1986 births
Living people
Footballers from Montevideo
Uruguayan people of Spanish descent
Uruguayan footballers
Association football goalkeepers
Peñarol players
Central Español players
Boca Juniors footballers
Club Atlético Vélez Sarsfield footballers
Rosario Central footballers
C.F. Pachuca players
Atlético Morelia players
Mazatlán F.C. footballers
Club Atlético Independiente footballers
Uruguayan Primera División players
Argentine Primera División players
Liga MX players
2022 FIFA World Cup players
Uruguay international footballers
Uruguayan expatriate footballers
Uruguayan expatriate sportspeople in Argentina
Uruguayan expatriate sportspeople in Mexico
Expatriate footballers in Argentina
Expatriate footballers in Mexico